John Stewart Covert (died March 3, 1881) was a ship builder and political figure in New Brunswick, Canada. He represented Sunbury County from 1868 to 1881 in the Legislative Assembly of New Brunswick as a Liberal member.

He was born and educated in Maugerville, New Brunswick. He married a Miss Mouatt and then a Miss Hains after his first wife's death. He was first elected to the provincial assembly in an 1868 by-election held after John McAdam was named to the Canadian Senate. Covert was a member of the Executive Council from 1871 to 1873. He died in office of a heart attack at Saint John.

References 
The Canadian parliamentary companion and annual register, 1880, CH Mackintosh
Obituary note, New York Times, March 4, 1881

Year of birth missing
1881 deaths
New Brunswick Liberal Association MLAs
Members of the Executive Council of New Brunswick